Alvin Brown (born September 1, 1969 in Kansas City, Missouri) is a professional American boxer in the Light Welterweight division and is the former North American Boxing Association (NABA) Featherweight champion.

Pro career
In August 2006, on ESPN's Friday Night Fights Alvin lost to title contender Rogers Mtagwa. In that fight Teddy Atlas predicted the knockout would be in the fourth round.

On March 14, 2008 Brown was knocked out by Mexican American Brandon Rios in Cicero Stadium, Cicero, Illinois.

References

External links

1969 births
Living people
Sportspeople from Kansas City, Missouri
Light-welterweight boxers
Boxers from Missouri
American male boxers
African-American boxers
21st-century African-American people
20th-century African-American sportspeople